Liv and Maddie, also known as Liv and Maddie: Cali Style for the fourth season, is an American comedy television series created by John D. Beck and Ron Hart that aired on Disney Channel from July 19, 2013 to March 24, 2017. The series stars Dove Cameron, Joey Bragg, Tenzing Norgay Trainor, Kali Rocha, Benjamin King, and Lauren Lindsey Donzis.

A significant feature of the series is that Dove Cameron plays dual roles, one being Liv, an actress who has returned to her home after starring on a popular television series in Hollywood for four years, and the other one being Maddie, Liv's identical twin who remained behind. Another significant feature of the series are documentary-style cutaways where characters speak to the viewers to explain their opinions on various situations in each episode.

Series overview

Episodes

Season 1 (2013–14)

Season 2 (2014–15)

Season 3 (2015–16)

Season 4: Cali Style (2016–17) 
 Lauren Lindsey Donzis joins the cast as Ruby, the daughter of Aunt Dena and cousin of Liv, Maddie, Joey and Parker; she takes the place of Benjamin King (Pete Rooney), who does not appear in this season.

See also 
 List of Liv and Maddie characters

References 

Lists of American children's television series episodes
Lists of American comedy television series episodes
Lists of Disney Channel television series episodes